During World War II, Operation Dunhill was a Special Air Service operation which began on 3 August 1944. Five teams, totalling 59 men, were to disrupt German activity in advance of Operation Cobra the American breakout from Normandy. 

In the event, four of the teams were relieved by the advancing Americans within twenty-four hours. 

The fifth team reported on German movements and secured about 200 Allied airmen before they linked up with the ground forces on 24 August.  

Operation Overlord
Special Air Service
World War II British Commando raids